"Feelin' So Good" is a song recorded by American singer Jennifer Lopez for her debut studio album On the 6 (1999). The lyrics were written by Cory Rooney and Lopez, while the music was written by Steven Standard, George Logios and Sean "Puffy" Combs, who also produced the song. It was released on January 25, 2000, as the fourth single from On the 6.

Composition
"Feelin' So Good" is a midtempo R&B/hip hop song with a length of five minutes and twenty-seven seconds (5:27). The song was written by Lopez with Cory Rooney, Christopher Rios, Joe Cartagena, Sean Combs, Steven Standard and George Logios, with Combs additionally serving as the track's producer.  It features rappers Big Pun and Fat Joe who often collaborated with each other. Lopez recorded her vocals for the song at Daddy's House Recording Studios and Sony Music Studios in New York City. It was later edited by Jim Janik and mixed by Prince Charles Alexander. Lyrically, the song is about Lopez being in a good mood, with nothing bringing her down. Lopez sings in the chorus: "I'm feelin' so good / I knew that I would / Been taking care of myself / Like I should / Cause not one thing / Can bring me down / Nothing in this world gonna turn me around". It contains a sample of Strafe's song "Set It Off" (1984).

Release and reception
Around the time of the single's release, Big Pun, who was slated to join Lopez and Fat Joe for a performance of the song on Saturday Night Live died after a heart attack related to weight issues. Lopez responded to this with a statement "He was a source of pride for the Latin community, a great artist and a great person. We will miss him terribly." The song was remixed for her J to tha L-O! The Remixes by Sean Combs, the song's original producer.

The song received positive reviews from music critics, who enjoyed Lopez going back to her roots. Richard Torress from Newsday said "Sean (Puffy) Combs shows a deft studio touch on the hip-hop jam "Feelin' so Good," with Lopez doing a good job on a track tailor-made for the talents of Mary J. Blige." Billboard writer Chuck Taylor observed that the song "abruptly changes gears" from the sound of her previous singles: "The result here is less Latin, more R&B-coated, and as tasty as cherry pie (...) Pumped with enough bass to bend steel, a hot-diggety backbeat, and a sunny chorus that's easy to memorize, 'Feelin' So Good' may be the hit to propel this star into the stratosphere." Describing "Feelin' So Good" as a "mid-tempo bop" and "sunny party song", Arielle Tschinkel of the website Idolator called Big Pun and Fat Joe "the peanut butter to Lopez’s jelly. Smooth yet sweet and complete perfection together." Tschinkel also noted: "the song introduced Lopez to the world as J.Lo. Of course, she would not formally take the moniker until she released her sophomore album in 2001, but glimmers of the J.Lo we know and love first came out in this song and its subsequent music video."

Despite only reaching #51 on the Billboard Hot 100, the single was considered a strong fourth single from Lopez, charting inside the top 20 of several charts.

Music video and live performances

The music video for the song was directed by Paul Hunter and shot in the Bronx.
It is the last video Pun would take part in before his death on February 7, 2000. 
The video starts with a white text that says "In loving memory of Christopher "Big Punisher" Rios (November 10, 1971 – February 7, 2000)", Lopez lying on the bed answering phone calls from both Big Pun and Fat Joe. She soon hangs up, has her breakfast (fed to her by Lopez's actual mother)  and begins her daily routine. She is seen finding money on the pavement, receiving a paycheck and buying clothes in a sale, which accounts for her good mood. Later, her friends (Lopez's actual friends) pick her up from her house, before they catch the 6 train to a club. There is then an instrumental break, where Lopez and some back-up dancers perform to Manu Dibango's 1972 song "Soul Makossa". The beat of "Feelin' So Good" returns, and Pun and Joe meet her in the club performing their raps. The video ends with Lopez and her friends returning to the station and catching the train, with Lopez looking out the dark window, reflecting on her day.

Lopez performed the song at the 2000 Kid's Choice Awards. Lopez also performed the song as a musical guest on the 11th (476th overall) episode of the 26th season of Saturday Night Live on February 5, 2000. In the performance, she appeared as a teen sneaking out of her house at night. Lopez sang the song at her 2011 Mohegan Sun concert. Additionally, it was included on the setlist for her 2012 Dance Again World Tour.

Formats and track listings

Australian CD maxi single
"Feelin' So Good" (Radio Edit) — 2:59
"Feelin' So Good" (Album Version) — 5:26
"Waiting for Tonight" (Hex's Momentous Radio Mix) — 3:52

Australian CD maxi single (The Remixes)
"Feelin' So Good" (Radio Edit) — 2:59
"Feelin' So Good" (HQ2 Radio Mix) — 3:45
"Feelin' So Good" (Bad Boy Alternate Mix) — 4:29
"Feelin' So Good" (Thunderpuss Radio Mix) — 3:50
"Feelin' So Good" (Thunderpuss Club Mix) — 9:14
"Feelin' So Good" (HQ2 Club Mix) — 7:25

European CD single
"Feelin' So Good" (Radio Edit) — 2:59
"Feelin' So Good" (HQ2 Radio Mix) — 3:45

European CD maxi single
"Feelin' So Good" (Radio Edit) — 2:59
"Feelin' So Good" (HQ2 Radio Mix) — 3:45
"Feelin' So Good" (Bad Boy Alternate Mix) — 4:29
"Feelin' So Good" (Thunderpuss Radio Mix) — 3:50

European 12" vinyl
"Feelin' So Good" (HQ2 Club Mix) — 7:25
"Feelin' So Good" (Bad Boy Alternate Mix) — 4:29
"Feelin' So Good" (Thunderpuss Club Mix) — 9:14
"Feelin' So Good" (Album Version) — 5:26

UK cassette single
"Feelin' So Good" — 5:26
"Feelin' So Good" (Puffy's Single Mix) — 4:31

UK CD single
"Feelin' So Good" — 5:26
"Feelin' So Good" (Puffy's Single Mix) — 4:31
"If You Had My Love" (Dark Child Master Mix) — 4:25

US CD single / 7" vinyl
"Feelin' So Good" (Bad Boy Remix) — 4:31
"Feelin' So Good" (Album Version) — 5:30

US CD maxi single
"Feelin' So Good" (Thunderpuss Radio Mix) — 3:50
"Feelin' So Good" (HQ2 Radio Mix) — 3:45
"Feelin' So Good" (Thunderpuss Club Mix) — 9:16
"Feelin' So Good" (HQ2 Club Mix) — 7:25
"Waiting for Tonight" (Hex's Momentous Club Mix) — 11:17

US 12" vinyl
"Feelin' So Good" (Thunderpuss Club Mix) — 9:14
"Feelin' So Good" (HQ2 Club Mix) — 7:25
"Feelin' So Good" (Thunderpuss Tribe-A-Pella) — 6:56
"Feelin' So Good" (Bad Boy Alternate Mix) — 4:29
"Feelin' So Good" (Album Version) — 5:30

Charts

Weekly charts

Year-end charts

Certifications

Release history

See also
 List of number-one dance singles of 2000 (U.S.)

References

External links
 

1999 songs
2000 singles
Big Pun songs
Fat Joe songs
Jennifer Lopez songs
Music videos directed by Paul Hunter (director)
Songs written by Sean Combs
Songs written by Cory Rooney
Songs written by Jennifer Lopez
Songs written by Fat Joe
Songs written by Big Pun